Army Institute of Law (AIL) is a private law school in Mohali, Punjab, India. The institute is affiliated to Punjabi University, Patiala, and is run by the Army Welfare Education Society (AWES).  The institute has a moderately sized campus in Sector 68, Mohali. The hostels can house 400 students.

History
Army institute of law was established in 1999 by the Indian Army under the Army Welfare Education Society. In July 2003, the Institute shifted to Sector 68, Mohali. On 1 December 2003, the Mohali Campus was inaugurated by H.E. Dr. APJ Abdul Kalam, the then President of India. The institute is affiliated to the Punjabi University, Patiala and approved by the Bar Council of India.

The National Assessment and Accreditation Council have accredited AIL with a grade 'A'. The institution offers 5-year integrated BA LLB programme and a 1-year postgraduate LLM programme with a specialisation in Family Law or Criminal Law. Both the programmes offered by the institution are approved by the Bar Council of India.

Academics

Undergraduate 
AIL offers a 5-year integrated B.A LL.B. program. The school reserves 100 seats of the total 75 for wards of Army personnel and 20 are available for civilians. Twenty civilian slots are for students from Punjab and five are for the All-India Civil Category. The college is approved by the Bar Council of India. Admission is based on the Army Institute of Law Entrance Test, except that civilian students from Punjab are selected on the basis of 10+2 marks.

Postgraduate 
AIL offers a one-year postgraduate L.L.M. program with options to specialize in Criminal Law or Family law. The prestigious course enrolls passionate students on the basis of a common entrance examination. The syllabus can be found here.

Admission Process

Undergraduate 
Army Institute of Law, Mohali conducts AIL LET, also known as the Army Institute of Law Entrance Test for admission to its undergraduate course.

 Admission to 60 seats for wards of army personnel is done through entrance test(Online LET) conducted by AIL under the aegis of AWES.
 Admission to 04 seats in the All India Category through the same entrance test.
 Candidates for both Army and All India Category are called for counselling as per merit in the written exam. Admission is granted only if the candidate is found eligible on the day of counselling.
 Admission to 16 seats in the Punjab Category is based on 10+2 merits, drawn up by the nominated university as per the notification issued by Govt. of Punjab.

Fees & Eligibility

Scholarship 
AIL offers the following scholarships to the students:

 Tata Memorial Scholarship is offered to the wards of Army personnel on securing first or second position in four consecutive years. Eight students are awarded a cash prize of INR 20,000 (1st position) and INR 15,000 (2nd position).
 It awards Abhimanyu Scholarship of INR 2,00,000 to the topper of AIL Law Entrance Test.
 Angad Singh Dhindsa Scholarship of INR 2,00,000 is granted to a female student who secures the highest marks in the first three years of 5-year BA LLB integrated programme.

The students of AIL are also eligible for the following industry-sponsored scholarships:

 A scholarship of INR 50,000 is awarded to the toppers of Economics and Jurisprudence jointly by the State Bank of India.
 PNB Housing Finance Ltd. awards nine merit-cum-means scholarships carrying a cash prize of INR 11,50,000, which is divided equally among the deserving students.

Bajaj Allianz offers a scholarship of INR 50,000 to the toppers of Law Evidence and Law of Torts.

Research 

 Centre for Research in Corporate Law & Governance (CRCLG) :  Centre for research in Corporate Law & Governance (CRCLG), is created with the objective to promote interdisciplinary research in the field of corporate law & governance.
 AIL, Centre for Research in Social Sciences (ACRSS) : The Army Institute of Law, Centre for Research in Social Sciences has been conceptualized with the objective to sensitize the youth towards social concerns which plague the contemporary society and equip them efficiently deal with these concerns by facilitating academic research across multiple disciplines.
 Centre for Research in Constitutional Law and Policy (CRCLP) : Centre for Research in Constitutional Law and Policy (CRCLP) has been established with an objective to provide a platform to the students to bring forth their ideas on recent developments on constitutional law and promote research on constitutional and policy matters. CRCLP aims to initiate a dialogue on contemporary constitutional dynamics with maximum students' participation.
 AIL Centre For Gender Empowerment (ACGE) : ABHAYAM : AIL Centre for Gender Empowerment (ACGE). Abhayam, AIL Centre for Gender Empowerment is an endeavor to promote awareness about gender issues and widen the scope of discourse on gender in society fostering a spirit of inclusivity. The Centre aims to foster acceptance and greater harmony for the LGBTQIA+ community and the women community in the campus.

Governance 

 The institute is established under the aegis of the Army Welfare Education Society (AWES) and functions under the patronage of Headquarters Western Command, Chandimandir.
 There is a three tier hierarchy for the governance of the institute: GOC-In-C, HQ Western Command, Patron-in-Chief, AIL; COS HQ Western Command & Patron, AIL; and MG AOC, HQ Western Command & Chairman, AIL.
 At the Institute level, there is Principal, Registrar, Placement Officer, teaching and non-teaching staff.

References

External links

Law schools in Punjab, India
Education in Mohali
1999 establishments in Punjab, India
Educational institutions established in 1999